Madame X is a lost 1916 American silent drama film directed by George F. Marion that was based on the 1908 play of the same name by French playwright Alexandre Bisson (1848 – 1912). Dorothy Donnelly, star of the 1910 Broadway production of the play, which was also directed by Marion, reprised her starring role for the film.

Plot
A woman is thrown out of her home by her jealous husband and sinks into depravity. Twenty years later, she finds herself accused of murder for saving her son, who does not know who she is. He finds himself defending her without knowing her background.

Cast
 Dorothy Donnelly as Jacqueline Floriot
 John Bowers as Monsieur Floriot
 Edwin Forsberg as Laroque (credited as Edwin Fosberg)
 Ralph Morgan as Raymond Floriot
 Robert Fischer as Merival
 Charles E. Bunnell as Perrissard (credited as Charles Bunnell)
 Gladys Coburn as Helene

See also
 Madame X

References

External links

1916 films
1916 drama films
1916 lost films
American silent feature films
American black-and-white films
Silent American drama films
American films based on plays
Lost drama films
Lost American films
1910s American films